Edward Short may refer to:

Edward Short, Baron Glenamara (1912–2012), British politician
Edward Short (judge) (1806–1871)

See also
Edward Shortt (1862–1935), British politician